Moyencharia ochreicosta is a moth of the family Cossidae. It is found from western Burkina Faso south through north-eastern and south-eastern Ghana to south-eastern and east-central Nigeria. It is probably also present in Togo and Benin. The habitat consists of rain forests and riparian forests at low elevations.

The wingspan is about 23.5 mm for males and 21 mm for males. The forewings are warm buff and ivory yellow or light orange yellow and ivory yellow. The hindwings are glossy warm buff with ivory yellow towards the base.

References

Moths described in 1929
Moyencharia
Insects of West Africa
Fauna of Togo
Moths of Africa